James Franklin "Bud" Ledbetter (December 15, 1852 – July 9, 1937) was an American Deputy Marshall in the Indian Territory.

Biography
Ledbetter was born on December 15, 1852 on his grandfather, George Washington Ledbetter's farm in Aurora, Arkansas to James Franklin and Sabrina Reeves Ledbetter.

He retired in 1928.

See also
The Passing of the Oklahoma Outlaws

References

1852 births
1937 deaths
United States Marshals
People from Madison County, Arkansas
People from Muskogee, Oklahoma
Police officers from Oklahoma